Armando Goufas (born 2 February 1995) is a Greek-born Nicaraguan footballer who plays as a forward for
Aris Petroupolis and the Nicaragua national team.

Early life
Goufas was born in Athens to a Greek father and a Nicaraguan mother.

International career
He made his debut for Nicaragua national football team on 3 March 2019 in a friendly against Bolivia.

International goals
Scores and results list Nicaragua's goal tally first

References

1995 births
Living people
People with acquired Nicaraguan citizenship
Nicaraguan men's footballers
Nicaragua international footballers
Association football forwards
Football League (Greece) players
Panegialios F.C. players
Apollon Smyrnis F.C. players
Irodotos FC players
Radomiak Radom players
Nicaraguan expatriate footballers
Nicaraguan expatriates in Poland
Expatriate footballers in Poland
Nicaraguan people of Greek descent
Footballers from Athens
Greek men's footballers
Greek expatriate footballers
Greek expatriate sportspeople in Poland
Greek people of Nicaraguan descent
2019 CONCACAF Gold Cup players